Joe Boyce (born 1 February 1994) is an Australian professional rugby league footballer who plays for the Townsville Blackhawks in the Queensland Cup.

Background
Born on the Sunshine Coast, Queensland, Boyce played his junior football for the Sunshine Coast Sea Eagles, Nambour Crushers and Norths Devils, before being signed by the Newcastle Knights.

Playing career

Early career
After trialling with the Penrith Panthers, a Newcastle Knights scout signed Boyce to a 2-year contract starting in 2013. In 2013 and 2014, he played for the Knights' NYC team. In October 2014, he signed a 2-year contract with the Brisbane Broncos starting in 2015, following Knights coach Wayne Bennett to the Broncos.

2015
In Round 11 of the 2015 NRL season, Boyce made his NRL debut for the Broncos against his former club, the Newcastle Knights.

2018
After a number of seasons playing for the Broncos' feeder clubs, Boyce joined the Townsville Blackhawks for the 2018 season.

References

External links
2015 Brisbane Broncos profile

1994 births
Living people
Australian rugby league players
Brisbane Broncos players
Norths Devils players
Rugby league locks
Rugby league players from Queensland
Souths Logan Magpies players
Sunshine Coast Sea Eagles players